Nottingham Arts Theatre is a theatre on George Street in Nottingham, England. Formerly known as the Co-op Arts Theatre, it is located in the former George Street Particular Baptist Church building.

It has a seating capacity of 274 in the Auditorium and a newer, 50-seat studio theatre. It is operated by an educational charity. It has seen a few notable entertainers on its stage, such as some of the members of Nottingham-based band Dog Is Dead. The theatre premiered the stage version of Alan Sillitoe's novel Saturday Night and Sunday Morning. It also stages a pantomime and a youth theatre production annually. 

As an educational charity, Nottingham Arts Theatre takes pride in providing opportunities for young people, primarily through its youth theatre group. The Youth Theatre Group is dedicated to creating an environment for young people to grow, learn and be creative through workshops and performances. Another, newer tradition is the summer 'Show in a Week' where minors (often from the youth theatre) come and stage a one-night show after a week's rehearsal.

Productions
In recent years it has put on shows such as:
The King and I (2010)
Les Misérables, Youth Theatre (2009)
Our Day Out, Youth Theatre (2010)
RENT: School Edition, Youth Theatre (2011)
Dangerous Corner (2010)
Annie Get Your Gun (2011)
Run for Your Wife (2010)
Tommy (2009)
The Roses of Eyam (2011)
A Midsummer Night's Dream (2008)
The Full Monty (2011)

The theatre's 2012 pantomime production of Puss in Boots was the subject of a documentary, Panto!, by Jeanie Finlay, which was a co-production by Glimmer Films and Met Film Production for BBC Storyville. It was first aired on BBC Four on Monday 22 December 2014.

References

External links

Theatres in Nottingham